Tebedu may refer to:
Tebedu
Tebedu (state constituency), represented in the Sarawak State Legislative Assembly